Sorrel (Rumex acetosa), also called common sorrel or garden sorrel, is a perennial herbaceous plant in the family Polygonaceae. Other names for sorrel include spinach dock and narrow-leaved dock ('dock' being a common name for the genus Rumex).

Sorrel is native to Eurasia and a common plant in grassland habitats. It is often cultivated as a leaf vegetable or herb.

Description
The upper ones are sessile, and frequently become crimson. It has whorled spikes of reddish-green flowers, which bloom in early summer, becoming purplish. The species is dioecious, with stamens and pistils on different plants.

Subspecies
Several subspecies have been named. Not all are cultivated.
 Rumex acetosa subsp. acetosa
 Rumex acetosa subsp. ambiguus
 Rumex acetosa subsp. arifolius
 Rumex acetosa subsp. hibernicus
 Rumex acetosa subsp. hirtulus
 Rumex acetosa subsp. vinealis

Distribution and habitat
Rumex acetosa occurs in grassland habitats throughout Europe from the northern Mediterranean coast to the north of Scandinavia and in parts of Central Asia. It occurs as an introduced species in parts of New Zealand, Australia and North America. It can grow in poor soil.

Ecology
The leaves are eaten by the larvae of several species of Lepidoptera (butterfly and moth) including the blood-vein moth, as well as by non-specialized snails and slugs.

Uses

Common sorrel has been cultivated for centuries. The leaves are edible when young but toughen with age; they may be puréed in soups and sauces or added to salad. The plant has a distinct sharp, sour taste. It contains oxalic acid, which can be poisonous in high quantities.

In India, the leaves are used in soups or curries made with yellow lentils and peanuts. In Afghanistan, the leaves are coated in a wet batter and deep fried, then served as an appetizer or if in season during Ramadan, for breaking the fast. In Armenia, the leaves are collected in spring, woven into braids, and dried for use during winter. The most common preparation is aveluk soup, where the leaves are rehydrated and rinsed to reduce bitterness, then stewed with onions, potatoes, walnuts, garlic and bulgur wheat or lentils, and sometimes sour plums.

Throughout eastern Europe, wild or garden sorrel is used to make sour soups, stewed with vegetables or herbs, meat or eggs. In rural Greece, it is used with spinach, leeks, and chard in spanakopita. 

"Escalope de saumon à l'oseille" (salmon escalope in sorrel sauce), invented in 1962 by the Troisgros brothers, is an emblematic dish of the French nouvelle cuisine. French cuisine traditionally cooks fish with sorrel because its acidity dissolves thin fish bones.

In the Caribbean, the roselle flower commonly made into sweet drinks is known as "sorrel", but this plant from Western Africa is actually a form of hibiscus unrelated to the Eurasian sorrel herb.

References

External links

 

Rumex
Herbs
Sour foods
Leaf vegetables
Perennial vegetables
Medicinal plants
Caribbean cuisine
Plants described in 1753
Ukrainian cuisine
Polish cuisine
Dioecious plants
Russian cuisine
Taxa named by Carl Linnaeus